Ahmad Zikri bin Mohd Khalili (born 25 June 2002) is a Malaysian footballer who plays for Selangor in the Malaysia Super League as a defender with play role as a left-back.

Club career

Early year
Zikri was born in Bandar Tun Razak, Pahang. Alongside with his current teammates Sikh Izhan Nazrel, he also a part of the Malaysia Pahang Sports School and Bukit Jalil Sports School until together make a transfer to AMD (Mokhtar Dahari Academy).<ref name="Early Career"

Selangor

Alongside with current teammates Izhan, Zikri moved to Selangor after graduated from AMD. He choose Selangor as the reason for the next destination to develop his talents. He represent academy club Selangor II and involved ten (10) matches for 2020 Malaysia Premier League season.

On 10 October 2020, Zikri make his senior debut and playing 90-minutes against FELDA United at Super League matches. He also involved the match against Melaka United at Malaysia Cup tournament, help the team going through the quarter-finals with a win by 2–1. On 2 December 2020, Selangor confirmed that Zikri would be definitely promoted to senior's first team for the 2021 season.

International career

Youth
Zikri has represented Malaysia at all youth level from the under 16-side to the under-19 sides. He represent the national team under-16 for the 2018 AFC U-16 Championship that took place in Kuala Lumpur, Malaysia. He played all matches on that tournament, but the squad failed to reach the knockout stage after their being eliminated at the group stage.

Then, he later moved up to represent the under 19s squad for 2018 AFF U-19 Youth Championship in the Vietnam. Zikri almost played all matches at the tournament, including semi-finals and final matches. However, the squad suddenly lost by the hand of Australia in the final by 1–0. After that, he also be a part of the squad under 19s for 2020 AFC U-19 Championship qualification, which he involved three  matches at the group stage and help the team to through the final tournament.

Career statistics

Club

Honours

International
Malaysia U19
 AFF U-19 Youth Championship runners up : 2019

References

Malaysian footballers
Selangor FA players
Malaysia Premier League players
Malaysia Super League players
Malaysian people of Malay descent
People from Selangor
Association football forwards
Living people
2002 births
Competitors at the 2021 Southeast Asian Games
Southeast Asian Games competitors for Malaysia